Sudak City Municipality, officially "the territory governed by the Sudak city council" is one of the 25 regions of the Crimean peninsula, currently subject to a territorial dispute between the Russian Federation and Ukraine. Population:

Administrative divisions
Within the framework of administrative divisions of Russia, Sudak is, together with a number of urban and rural localities, incorporated separately as the town of republican significance of Sudak—an administrative unit with the status equal to that of the districts. As a municipal division, the town of republican significance of Sudak is incorporated as Sudak Urban Okrug.

Within the framework of administrative divisions of Ukraine, Sudak is incorporated as the town of republican significance of Sudak. Ukraine does not have municipal divisions.

Besides the city of Sudak the region includes the town of Novyi Svet and 14 villages which are organised into 7 communities.

Former Crimean Tatar names which were officially changed in 1945-49 and are now used only by the Crimean Tatar community are mentioned in brackets.

 Vesele village community
 Vesele (Qutlaq)
 Hrushivka village community
 Hrushivka (Suvuq Sala)
 Perevalivka (El Buzlu)
 Kholodivka (Osmançıq)
 Dachne village community
 Dachne (Taraq Taş)
 Lisne (Suvuq Suv)
 Mizhrichchya village community
 Mizhrichchya (Ay Serez)
 Voron
 Morske village community
 Morske (Qapsihor)
 Hromivka (Şelen)
 Novyi Svit town community
 Novyi Svit
 Sonyachna Dolyna village community
 Sonyachna Dolyna (Qoz)
 Bahativka (Toqluq)
 Myndalne (Arqa Deresi)
 Pryberezhne (Kefessiya)

References

 
Municipalities of Crimea